The British Virgin Islands competed at the 2015 World Championships in Athletics held in Beijing, China, from 22 to 30 August 2015.

Results
(q – qualified, NM – no mark, SB – season best)

Women 
Track and road events

Field events

References

Nations at the 2015 World Championships in Athletics
World Championships in Athletics
British Virgin Islands at the World Championships in Athletics